= Kazi Ahmad railway station =

Railway station in Pakistan

Kazi Ahmad railway station قاضي احمد ريلوي اسٽيشن

General information
- Owner: Ministry of Railways

Other information
- Station code: KZO

History
- Former names: Great Indian Peninsula Railway

Kazi Ahmad railway station (Urdu: قاضی احمد ریلوے اسٹیشن, Sindhi: قاضي احمد ريلوي اسٽيشن) is located in Pakistan.

== See also ==
- List of railway stations in Pakistan
- Pakistan Railways
